This article presents a list of the historical events and publications of Australian literature during 2011.

Events
Four authors are named in the Queen's Birthday Honours: Peter FitzSimons, Susanne Gervay, Roland Perry, and Chris Wallace-Crabbe
Thomas Keneally donates his personal library to the Sydney Mechanics' School of Arts
Australian libraries and library associations join together to make 2012 the National Year of Reading
Australian Booksellers Association (ABA) declares Saturday, 20 August 2011, the inaugural National Bookshop Day
 Final issue of the "Australian Literary Review" to be published in October 2011
Hannie Rayson is the first Australian to be awarded a commission with New York’s Manhattan Theatre Club
Friends and family of biographer Hazel Rowley establish funds to commemorate Rowley’s life and her writing legacy via the Hazel Rowley Literary Fund
Alison Lester and Boori Monty Pryor are appointed to be Australia’s first Children’s Laureates
The University of Technology Sydney (UTS) appoints Robert Adamson to hold the inaugural CAL Chair in Australian Poetry

Major publications

Literary fiction
 Tony Birch – Blood
 Geraldine Brooks – Caleb's Crossing
 Annah Faulkner – The Beloved
 Anna Funder – All That I Am
 Kate Grenville – Sarah Thornhill
 Gail Jones – Five Bells
 Jeanine Leane – Purple Threads
 Gillian Mears – Foal's Bread
 Alex Miller – Autumn Laing
 Frank Moorhouse – Cold Light
 Favel Parrett – Past The Shallows
 Elliot Perlman – The Street Sweeper
 Craig Sherborne – The Amateur Science of Love
 Rohan Wilson – The Roving Party
 Charlotte Wood – Animal People

Children's and Young Adult fiction
 Alexandra Adornetto – Hades
 Em Bailey – Shift
 J. C. Burke – Pig Boy
 Isobelle Carmody – The Sending
 Ursula Dubosarsky – The Golden Day
 Scott Gardner – The Dead I Know
 Steven Herrick – Black Painted Fingernails
 Andrew McGahan – The Coming of the Whirlpool
 Melina Marchetta – Froi of the Exiles
 Vikki Wakefield – All I Ever Wanted
 Scott Westerfeld – Goliath

Science Fiction and Fantasy
 Max Barry – Machine Man
 Trudi Canavan – The Rogue
 Peter Docker – The Water Boys
 Greg Egan – The Clockwork Rocket
 Will Elliott – Shadow
 Kim Falconer – Road to the Soul
 Pamela Freeman – Ember and Ash
 Richard Harland – Liberator
 Glenda Larke – Stormlord's Exile
 Kim Westwood – The Courier's New Bicycle

Crime and Mystery
 Alan Carter – Prime Cut
 Peter Corris – Follow the Money
 Garry Disher – Whispering Death
 Kerry Greenwood – Cooking the Books
 Stuart Littlemore – Harry Curry: Counsel of Choice
 Barry Maitland – Chelsea Mansion
 Kel Robertson – Rip Off
 Michael Robotham – The Wreckage

Poetry
 Ali Alizadeh – Ashes in the Air
 Joanne Burns – Amphora
 Barry Hill – Lines for Birds: Poems and Paintings
 John Kinsella – Armour
 Geoffrey Lehmann and Robert Gray – Australian Poetry Since 1788 (edited)
 Jaya Savige – Surface to Air

Biography
 Julian Assange – Julian Assange: The Unauthorised Autobiography
 A. J. Brown – Michael Kirby: Paradoxes and Principles
 Eileen Chanin – Book Life: The Life and Times of David Scott Mitchell 1836–1907
 Raimond Gaita – After Romulus
 Mark McKenna – An Eye for Eternity: The Life of Manning Clark
Susan Mitchell – Tony Abbott: A Man's Man
 Christine Nixon – Fair Cop
 Sue Pieters-Hawke – Hazel: My Mother's Story
 Alice Pung – Her Father's Daughter
 David Robert Walker  – Not Dark Yet: A Personal History
 Sarah Watt, William McInnes – Worse Things Happen at Sea

Awards and honours

Lifetime achievement

Fiction

International

National

Children and Young Adult

National

Crime and Mystery

National

Science Fiction

Non-Fiction

Poetry

Drama

Deaths
 1 March – Hazel Rowley, author (born 1951)
 15 June – Anne Godfrey-Smith, poet and theatre producer/director (born 1921)
 19 June – T. A. G. Hungerford, author (born 1915)
 2 September – Bernard Smith, art historian (born 1916)
 27 September – Sara Douglass, author (born 1957)
 4 October – Di Gribble, editor and publisher (born 1942)
 8 December – Zelman Cowen, jurist (born 1919)
Unknown date

 May – Robert J. Merritt, playwright (born 1945)

See also
 Literature
 List of years in Australian literature
 List of Australian literary awards
 2011 in Australia
 2011 in literature
 2011 in poetry

References

Literature
Australian literature by year
21st-century Australian literature
2011 in literature